Steve Naughton is a former Australian professional rugby league footballer who played for the Yass Magpies in the Canberra Raiders Cup, after five years on the sideline.  He last played for the Pia Donkeys in the Elite One Championship in France before making a return with his boyhood club. Naughton previously played with the Sydney Roosters in the National Rugby League and he plays fullback and halfback. In 2016 he became coach of the Magpies.

Early life
Naughton started playing Rugby League at age 5. His junior club was the Yass Magpies.

Nickname

During his time as a Toyota Cup, Naughton was affectionately known as "Cheeseburgers". This nickname is believed to have originated at a Sutton Forest Eatery on the trip back from a Toyota Cup match in Sydney.

References

External links
 https://web.archive.org/web/20110220045529/http://www.sydneyroosters.com.au/

1989 births
Living people
Australian rugby league players
Baroudeurs de Pia XIII players
Rugby league fullbacks
Rugby league halfbacks
Rugby league players from Sydney
Rugby league wingers
Sydney Roosters players